Jongno Tower (Hangeul: 종로 타워) is a 33-story office building in Jongno, Seoul. Its top floor is equipped with a restaurant and bar which is famous for its view of Jongno and other areas of Seoul. The tower is located near Jonggak Station of Seoul Subway Line 1. The 23rd to 30th floors are hollow. The hangeul lettering is 삼성증권 (Samsung Securities), the owner of the building. It was designed by Rafael Viñoly Architects, and built in 1999. Its height is 132 meters.

References

Buildings and structures in Jongno District
Office buildings completed in 1999
Skyscraper office buildings in Seoul
Rafael Viñoly buildings
1999 establishments in South Korea
20th-century architecture in South Korea